Street Band (foaled  February 2, 2016) is an American Thoroughbred racehorse and the winner of the 2019 Cotillion Handicap.

Career

Street Band's first race was on July 23rd, 2018 at Delaware Park, where she came in eight. She fared much better in her second race on September 3rd, 2018, where she won at Ellis Park.  

Her 2019 season began with a win at the Fair Grounds on January 13rd, 2019. On March 23rd, 2019, she won the Grade-2 Fair Grounds Oaks. She competed in the Grade-1 2019 Kentucky Oaks, but came in 6th. She had a much better performance in July, when she won the Grade-3 Indiana Oaks. 

She tried her hand at the Grade-1 2019 Alabama Stakes, in August, and came in third place. She then scored the biggest win of her career by winning the September 21st, 2019 Cotillion Handicap. The win helped her earn placement in the Grade-1 November 2nd, 2019 Breeders' Cup Distaff, where she finished in sixth place.

Pedigree

References

2016 racehorse births